BOBBY may refer to:

 BOBBY (band), a cooperative musical project
 BOBBY (album), the debut studio album by the band of the same name